The Platani, known in ancient Greek as the  (Lykos, "wolf") or  (Halykos, "Salty"), is a river in southern Sicily, Italy. It is the fifth longest in the island after Imera Meridionale, Simeto, Belice and Dittaino, with a course of 103 km, and the third for drainage basin with 1,785 km2, after the Simeto and Imera Meridionale. It flows through the provinces of Palermo and Agrigento, marking the boundary between the latter and that of Caltanissetta.

The river generates at the confluence of Platani di Lercara and Platani di Castronuovo, which, respectively, springs in the comuni of Lercara Friddi (under the Pizzo Lanzone mountain) and Santo Stefano Quisquina (between the Serra della Moneta and Pizzo della Rondine mountains). From the confluence to the mouth it runs for c. 83 km; including the branch of Castronuovo the total length is 103 km. Along its course the Platani receives the waters of several affluents, including the Gallo d'Oro, Turvoli, Vallone Morella, Vallone Tumarrano and Vallone di Aragona.

The river flows into the Strait of Sicily, near Capo Bianco, on the boundary of the comuni of Ribera and Cattolica Eraclea.

References

Sources 

Rivers of Italy
Rivers of Sicily
Rivers of the Province of Palermo
Rivers of the Province of Agrigento
Rivers of the Province of Caltanissetta
European drainage basins of the Mediterranean Sea